Christ Church, Wolverhampton is a former parish church in the Church of England in Wolverhampton

History

The church was built in 1867 to designs of the local architect Edward Banks. The aisles were added in 1869 and the church was consecrated on 3 November 1870 by the Bishop of Lichfield.  The chancel was added in 1887. The chancel was decorated with wall paintings in 1903 by J. Edie Read and Wyndham Hughes. A chapel and vestries were completed in 1906. The tower was never completed.

A parish was assigned out of St Andrew's Church, Wolverhampton on 27 October 1876.

It was made redundant and demolished in 1975 and a Mosque was built on the site.

Organ

The church had a pipe organ by J.W. Walker and Sons. A specification of the organ can be found on the National Pipe Organ Register.

References

Church of England church buildings in the West Midlands (county)
Churches completed in 1867